Amphibolurus centralis, the Centralian lashtail, is a species of agama found in Australia.

References

External Links

Amphibolurus
Agamid lizards of Australia
Taxa named by Arthur Loveridge
Reptiles described in 1933